The following is a list of Grammy Awards winners and nominees from the United Kingdom.
Amongst the winners, Paul McCartney and Adele are the most honoured male and female British artists respectively. Adele also is the most awarded female foreign act in Grammy history.

List

References

British
Grammy
Grammy